Girls' School is a 1950 American drama film directed by Lew Landers and starring Joyce Reynolds, Ross Ford, Kasey Rogers, Julia Dean, Thurston Hall, and Leslie Banning. The film was released by Columbia Pictures on February 9, 1950.

Plot

Cast

References

External links

1950 drama films
American drama films
1950 films
Columbia Pictures films
American black-and-white films
1950s English-language films
Films directed by Lew Landers
1950s American films